Waipara is a small town in north Canterbury, New Zealand, on the banks of the Waipara River. Its name translates to "Muddy Water", wai meaning water and para meaning mud.

It is at the junction of state highways 1 and 7, 60 kilometres north of Christchurch. Hanmer Springs is 76 kilometres (55 minutes drive) north of Waipara.  It is also situated on the Main North Line railway.

Waipara lies at one of the points of the Alpine Pacific Triangle, which also includes the major tourist centers of Hanmer Springs and Kaikoura.

The Weka Pass Railway has its base in Waipara, and runs on 12 kilometres of track between there and Waikari over the former route of the Waiau Branch, a branch line railway that diverged from the Main North Line and ran to Waiau. The Glenmark station is based in Waipara.

The Glenmark church has closed down. It was damaged during the 2010 Christchurch earthquakes. The Waipara Hotel burnt down in 2014. It was not insured at the time and has not been replaced.

The Waipara region has a reputation as a premium area for the production of Pinot noir, Riesling and Chardonnay.  Waipara is sheltered by the Teviot hills from the prevailing cool easterly winds and has the highest summer temperatures and the lowest rainfall of any of the New Zealand wine regions. Because of this, Waipara has over 26 wineries and 80 vineyards within the valley, which collectively produce around 100,000 cases of award-winning wine in an average year. Many of the vineyards offer tastings at their cellar doors and some also have restaurants attached.

There are a number of day walks close in Waipara including Tiromoana Bush Walkway and the Mt Cass Walkway which is closed during lambing season. Waipara would have been once been covered in totara, lacebark, kowhai, lancewood and broadleaf forest. It is now predominantly vineyards. There have been a number of ongoing projects to increase the biodiversity of the area. Work is ongoing to plant native species in Waipara's shelter belts, stream boundaries, pond edges and vineyard borders. These have provided benefits in pollination, pest control and weed suppression. It has worked so well that the plantings have resulted in a drop in the use of pesticides in the vineyards. The Waipara Environmental Trapping Association (WETA) is aiming to trap rats and other introduced species with the aim of making Waipara a predator-free paradise for native birds.

Fossils 
Waipara is also known for some of the fossils discovered there including the Waipara penguin which is the second oldest penguin fossil to be found, a 62 million year old seabird Protodontopteryx ruthae and the Waipara turtle which is estimated to grow to 3 meters long and weigh around 600 kg, The first example of the extinct Haast's Eagle was found on Glenmark Station near Waipara in 1871.

Demographics
It is part of the wider Omihi statistical area.

Waipara had a population of 312 at the 2018 New Zealand census, an increase of 45 people (16.9%) since the 2013 census, and an increase of 54 people (20.9%) since the 2006 census. There were 117 households. There were 165 males and 150 females, giving a sex ratio of 1.1 males per female, with 66 people (21.2%) aged under 15 years, 42 (13.5%) aged 15 to 29, 153 (49.0%) aged 30 to 64, and 57 (18.3%) aged 65 or older.

Ethnicities were 94.2% European/Pākehā, 7.7% Māori, and 2.9% other ethnicities (totals add to more than 100% since people could identify with multiple ethnicities).

Although some people objected to giving their religion, 69.2% had no religion and 20.2% were Christian.

Of those at least 15 years old, 15 (6.1%) people had a bachelor or higher degree, and 72 (29.3%) people had no formal qualifications. The employment status of those at least 15 was that 141 (57.3%) people were employed full-time, 39 (15.9%) were part-time, and 6 (2.4%) were unemployed.

Education

Waipara School was established in 1917.

Sports 
Waipara and Omihi are the catchment area to the Glenmark Rugby Club. The Glenmark rugby club rooms burnt down in 2015. There have been ten All Blacks who have played for Glenmark over the years including Todd Blackadder, Robbie Deans, Bruce Deans, Craig Green, and Andy Earl. Glenmark has had success in the North Canterbury Rugby Competition winning the title in 2016 by beating the Ashley Rugby Club.

The Waipara Classic cycle race starts and finishes in Waipara. It has varied in length between 61 km and 90 km over the years.

Notable residents 
George Henry Moore was the owner of Glenmark Station just to the north of Waipara. At one stage there were 90,000 sheep and it was the most valuable farm in New Zealand.

References

Wine regions of New Zealand
Populated places in Canterbury, New Zealand
Hurunui District